Jiang Weisheng (born 5 September 1999) is a Chinese footballer currently playing for Vrakuňa Bratislava

Club career
Born in Qingdao, Shandong, Jiang started at the Qingdao FA. He travelled to France with the Chinese under-15 team, training with Metz, before a return to Asia, where he was injured while on trial with a South Korean side. In 2015, he went to Germany to train with the youth sides of Borussia Dortmund and Kickers Offenbach, before once again returning to China.

He perfected his English while back at home, before travelling once more to Europe, this time studying at the National University of Ukraine on Physical Education and Sport in Kyiv, Ukraine. While in Ukraine, he trained with a local side in Kyiv, as well as Obolon Kyiv and Arsenal Kyiv.

He also trialled with French side Auxerre and Portuguese side Cova da Piedade, where he was sidelined for three months after suffering a broken foot. He trained with Spartak Moscow, representing the Russian side at the 2018 Weifang Cup, before moving to Slovenia, signing with Tabor Sežana in January 2019, and spending the 2018–19 season on loan with Slovenian Third League side Primorje. He made two appearances for Primorje, including 68 minutes as a starter in the final game of the season; a 1–0 loss to Fama Vipava.

In 2019, he moved to Croatian side Kustošija, where he made one appearance before a move to Slovakia with FK Rakytovce, later renamed Hamsik Academy. In August 2022, Jiang signed for 3. Liga side Vrakuňa Bratislava.

International career
Jiang was called up to the China under-15 team in 2013.

Career statistics
.

References

1999 births
Living people
Footballers from Qingdao
Footballers from Shandong
Chinese footballers
China youth international footballers
Association football fullbacks
Association football midfielders
First Football League (Croatia) players
NK Tabor Sežana players
ND Primorje players
NK Kustošija players
RSC Hamsik Academy players
Chinese expatriate footballers
Chinese expatriate sportspeople in France
Expatriate footballers in France
Chinese expatriate sportspeople in Germany
Expatriate footballers in Germany
Expatriate footballers in Ukraine
Chinese expatriate sportspeople in Portugal
Expatriate footballers in Portugal
Chinese expatriate sportspeople in Russia
Expatriate footballers in Russia
Expatriate footballers in Slovenia
Chinese expatriate sportspeople in Croatia
Expatriate footballers in Croatia
Chinese expatriate sportspeople in Slovakia
Expatriate footballers in Slovakia